Gauteng is one of the nine multi-member constituencies of the National Assembly of South Africa, the lower house of the Parliament of South Africa, the national legislature of South Africa. The constituency was established as Pretoria–Witwatersrand–Vereeniging in 1994 when the National Assembly was established by the Interim Constitution following the end of Apartheid. It was renamed Gauteng in 1999. It is conterminous with the province of Gauteng. The constituency currently elects 48 of the 400 members of the National Assembly using the closed party-list proportional representation electoral system. At the 2019 general election it had 6,381,220 registered electors.

Electoral system
Gauteng currently elects 48 of the 400 members of the National Assembly using the closed party-list proportional representation electoral system. Constituency seats are allocated using the largest remainder method with a Droop quota.

Election results

Summary

Detailed

2019
Results of the 2019 general election held on 8 May 2019:

The following candidates were elected:
Heinrich April (ANC), Darren Bergman (DA), Ghaleb Cachalia (DA), Michéle Clarke (DA), Mathew Cuthbert (DA), Evert Phillipus du Plessis (DA), Annah Gela (ANC), Melina Gomba (ANC), Madeleine Hicklin (DA), Gerhard Koornhof (ANC), Tebogo Letsie (ANC), James Lorimer (DA), Peace Mabe (ANC), Dorothy Mabiletsa (ANC), Cameron Mackenzie (DA), Thlologelo Malatji (ANC), Boyce Maneli (ANC),  Lisa Mangcu (ANC), Bridget Masango (DA), Nomathemba Maseko-Jele (ANC), Mfana Mashego (ANC), Oscar Mathafa (ANC), Simphiwe Mbatha (ANC), Teliswa Mgweba (ANC), Jacqueline Mofokeng (ANC), Stevens Mokgalapa (DA), Anastasia Motaung (ANC), Pebane Moteka (EFF), Jaco Mulder (VF+), Tshilidzi Munyai (ANC), Duma Nkosi (ANC), Nontando Nolutshungu (EFF), Hope Papo (ANC), Chana Pilane-Majake (ANC), Nazley Sharif (DA), Patrick Sindane (EFF), Petros Sithole (IFP), Primrose Sonti (EFF), Bernice Swarts (ANC), Sophie Thembekwayo (EFF), Maggie Tlou (ANC), Alfred Tseki (ANC), Judith Tshabalala (ANC), Mgcini Tshwaku (EFF), Belinda van Onselen (DA), Philip van Staden (VF+), Bafuze Yabo (ANC) and Yoliswa Yako (EFF).

2014
Results of the 2014 general election held on 7 May 2014:

The following candidates were elected:
Patrick Atkinson (DA), Khumbuza Bavu (EFF), Roger William Tobias Chance (DA), Mamonare Patricia Chueu (ANC), Manuel de Freitas (DA), Joanmariae Louise Fubbs (ANC), Charles Danny Kekana (ANC), Ezekiel Kekana (ANC), Maesela David Kekana (ANC), Gerhard Koornhof (ANC), Mmamoloko Kubayi (ANC), Khanyisile Litchfield-Tshabalala (EFF), Xitlhangoma Mabasa (ANC), Peace Mabe (ANC), Gordon Mackay (DA), Patrick Maesela (ANC), Gratitude Magwanishe (ANC), Mmusi Maimane (DA), Lindiwe Michelle Maseko (ANC), Paul Mashatile (ANC), Amos Masondo (ANC), Alan Ross McLoughlin (DA), Mzameni Richard Mdakane (ANC), Mmeli Julius Mdluli (EFF), Tsepo Mhlongo (DA), Velhelmina Pulani Mogotsi (ANC), Maapi Angelina Molebatsi (ANC), Rebecca Getrude Mmamokgolo Monchusi (EFF), Masefele Rosalia Morutoa (ANC), Sej Motau (DA), Kenneth Mubu (DA), Jaco Mulder (VF+), Claudia Nonhlanhla Ndaba (ANC), Chana Pilane-Majake (ANC), Strike Michael Ralegoma (ANC), Deborah Dineo Raphuti (ANC), Marius Redelinghuys (DA), Hendrick Schmidt (DA), Petros Sithole (IFP), Vincent George Smith (ANC), Elizabeth Thabethe (ANC), Sello Albert Tleane (ANC), Dikeledi Rebecca Tsotetsi (ANC), Diliza Lucky Twala (EFF), Belinda van Onselen (DA), Des van Rooyen (ANC), Heinrich Cyril Volmink (DA) and Mike Waters (DA).

2009
Results of the 2009 general election held on 22 April 2009:

The following candidates were elected:
Obed Bapela (ANC), Loretta Bastardo-Ibanez (ANC), George Boinamo (DA), Fatima Chohan (ANC), Ian Davidson (DA), Bonginkosi Wesley Dhlamini (IFP), Anchen Dreyer (DA), Manuel de Freitas (DA), Joanmariae Louise Fubbs (ANC), Dion George (DA), Mondli Gungubele (ANC), Bertha Gxowa (ANC), Charles Danny Kekana (ANC), Julie Kilian (COPE), Junita Kloppers-Lourens (DA), Gerhard Koornhof (ANC), James Lorimer (DA), Xitlhangoma Mabaso (ANC), Nomopo Maggie Madlala (ANC), Mavis Nontsikelelo Magazi (ANC), Gratitude Magwanishe (ANC), Holmes Peter Maluleka (ANC), Frans Ting-Ting Masango (ANC), Maggie Margaret Maunye (ANC), Mzameni Richard Mdakane (ANC), Natasha Michael (DA), Emmanuel Musawenkosi Mlambo (ANC), Andrew Mlangeni (ANC), Poppy Audrey Mocumi (ANC), Stevens Mokgalapa (DA), Oupa Monareng (ANC), Emmah More (DA), Masefele Rosalia Morutoa (ANC), Sej Motau (DA), Kenneth Mubu (DA), Winnie Ngwenya (ANC), Phumelele Ntshiqela (COPE), Muntu Nxumalo (ANC), Eric Nyekemba (ANC), Ian Ollis (DA), Hendrick Schmidt (DA), Gregory David Schneemann (ANC), Elliot Mshiyeni Sogoni (ANC), Willie Durand Spies (VF+), Butch Steyn (DA), Elizabeth Thabethe (ANC), Siphiwe Isaac Thusi (COPE), Dikeledi Rebecca Tsotetsi (ANC), Ismail Vadi (ANC), Niekie van den Berg (DA), Manie van Dyk (DA), Ayanda Vanqa (ANC), Nolitha Yvonne Vukuza-Linda (COPE), Phindisile Pretty Xaba (ANC), Mike Waters (DA) and Marta Wenger (DA).

2004
Results of the 2004 general election held on 14 April 2004:

The following candidates were elected:
Obed Bapela (ANC), Loretta Bastardo-Ibanez (ANC), Hendrietta Bogopane-Zulu (ANC), Ismail Mahomed Cachalia (ANC), Ian Davidson (DA), Bonginkosi Wesley Dhlamini (IFP), Joanmariae Louise Fubbs (ANC), Douglas Gibson (DA), Bertha Gxowa (ANC), Fatima Hajaig (ANC), Barbara Hogan (ANC), Semamanyane Dorothy Hounkpatin (ANC), Charles Danny Kekana (ANC), Joyce Kgoali (ANC), Leslie Bernardus Labuschagne (DA), Mpetjane Kgaogelo Lekgoro (ANC), Tony Leon (DA), Mavis Nontsikelelo Magazi (ANC), Daniel Kapeni Maluleke (DA), Holmes Peter Maluleka (ANC), Maggie Margaret Maunye (ANC), Lefokane Lydia Meshoe (ACDP), Andrew Mlangeni (ANC), Aubrey Dundubala Mokoena (ANC), Jabu Moleketi (ANC), Oupa Monareng (ANC), Masefele Rosalia Morutoa (ANC), Jaco Mulder (VF+), Andries Nel (ANC), Nompendlko Doris Ngcengwane (ANC), Sisa James Njikelana (ANC), Richard Sibusiso Ntuli (DA), Muntu Nxumalo (ANC), Dorothy Mapula Ramodibe (ANC), Gregory David Schneemann (ANC), Janet Semple (DA), Dumisani Job Sithole (ANC), Vincent Geoge Smith (ANC), Themba Joseph Sono (ID), Raenette Taljaard (DA), Elizabeth Thabethe (ANC), Ismail Vadi (ANC), Manie van Dyk (DA), Lulama Xingwana (ANC) and Langa Zita (ANC).

1999
Results of the 1999 general election held on 2 June 1999:

1994
Results of the 1994 general election held on between 26 and 29 April 1994:

References

National Assembly constituency
National Assembly of South Africa constituencies
National Assembly of South Africa constituencies established in 1994